More Echoes, Touching Air Landscape is a split album by Japanese bands Boris and Choukoku no Niwa. It originally appeared in 1999, and was rereleased in 2006 on Inoxia Records with different packaging. Listed as one song but split into two tracks, "Kanau" begins with 15 minutes of drone metal exploration, then merges into a psychedelic sludge metal style prominently featured on Amplifier Worship.

Track listing

Choukoku no Niwa

Boris

Pressing history

Boris (band) EPs
1999 EPs
Inoxia Records albums